Sergei Nikolayevich Pavlov (born 20 January 1962) is a Russian professional football coach and a former player. He is the goalkeepers' coach for the Under-19 squad of FC Nizhny Novgorod.

External links
 Profile at playerhistory.com

1962 births
Sportspeople from Saratov
Living people
Soviet footballers
Russian footballers
Association football goalkeepers
Russian Premier League players
Russian expatriate footballers
Expatriate footballers in Germany
Russian football managers
FC Kryvbas Kryvyi Rih players
FC Akhmat Grozny players
FC Chernomorets Novorossiysk players
FC Sokol Saratov players
FC Sokol Saratov managers
FC Kristall Smolensk players
FC Iskra Smolensk players
FC Nosta Novotroitsk players